CHMA-FM is a radio station broadcasting at 106.9 MHz in Sackville, New Brunswick, Canada. It is a campus/community station functioning as the campus radio station of Mount Allison University and the community radio station of Sackville, New Brunswick.

History
On April 10, 1975, Attic Broadcasting Co. Ltd. (Mount Allison U.) received approval to operate a new AM radio station on 670 kHz at Sackville, New Brunswick. On August 12, 1985, Attic Broadcasting received approval from the Canadian Radio-television and Telecommunications Commission (CRTC) to convert CHMA from the AM dial to the FM dial at 106.9 MHz.

About 
Attic Broadcasting, which is the administrative body in charge of CHMA, is funded by the students at Mount Allison University and by community members. The programmers and board of directors consist of volunteers from the university and surrounding community. Day-to-day operations are supervised by a permanent station manager and programming director and a largely volunteer staff consisting of students and local community members.

Some notable past programmers include CBC broadcasters Ian Hanomansing and Khalil Akhtar, as well as indie musicians Julie Doiron and Shotgun Jimmie. CHMA airs the popular syndicated programme, Democracy Now! every weekday.

Charts 
CHMA maintains a top 30 music chart. The tracking time for CHMA's chart is every Wednesday from 2:00 - 5:00 PM AST.

Stereophonic Music Festival 
CHMA-FM is the primary organizer of an annual music festival called Stereophonic. The festival is dedicated to promoting local talent and volunteerism on all levels. Notable past performers include: Shotgun & Jaybird, Shotgun Jimmie, Frederick Squire, Al Tuck, Julie Doiron, Two Hours Traffic, Wintersleep, Plants and Animals, Woodhands, Baby Eagle, Rock Plaza Central, Tom Fun Orchestra, Jon-Rae Fletcher, Old Man Luedecke, Windom Earle, Ninja High School and many others.

References

External links
CHMA-FM
Stereophonic Music Festival
NCRA
 

Hma
Hma
Mount Allison University
Radio stations established in 1974
1974 establishments in New Brunswick